Kyungsun Suh (born 8 November 1942) is a South Korean composer.

Biography
Kyungsun Suh was born in Seoul, Korea. She studied composition and theory at the Seoul National University, graduating with bachelor's and master's degrees, and at the University of Massachusetts Amherst. After completing her studies she took a position teaching at Hanyang University in 1974. Her works have been performed internationally.

Suh served as president of the Korean Society of Women Composers from 1993 to 1997. She organized the Asian Contemporary Music Festivals in Seoul and Suwon in 1993 and 2002. She received the Okwan (Jade) Medal of Culture from South Korea's Ministry of Culture and Tourism, and an Arts Award from the Arts Council of Korea in 2005. She is professor emeritus at Hanyang University.

Works
Suh has composed for orchestra, chamber ensemble, voice and solo instrument. Selected works include:
An Illusion (1977)
Phenomenon I (1982)
Pentastisch (1987)
At the Soo-kook (1991)
Poem (1992)
Poem for orchestra (1994)
Concerto Grosso (1996)

Suh has also published articles on music and two books:
The Language of My Music (Taipei, 1985)
Some Characteristics of Ancient Korean Aristocratic Music (Bangkok, 1995)

References

1942 births
Living people
20th-century classical composers
South Korean music educators
Women classical composers
South Korean classical composers
People from Seoul
Seoul National University alumni
University of Massachusetts Amherst alumni
Academic staff of Hanyang University
Women music educators
20th-century women composers